Princess Pauline  may refer to:
 Princess Pauline, Duchess of Sagan (1782–1845), a Princess of Courland by birth 
 Princess Pauline of Orange-Nassau (1800–1806), a Princess of the House of Orange-Nassau
 Princess Pauline of Waldeck and Pyrmont (1855–1925), a member of the House of Waldeck and Pyrmont 
 Princess Pauline of Württemberg (1810–1856), a member of the House of Württemberg and a Princess of Württemberg by birth
 Princess Pauline of Württemberg (1877–1965), the only daughter of William II of Württemberg
 Princess Pauline von Metternich (1836–1921), a famous Viennese and Parisian socialite of great charm and elegance
 Princess Pauline Borghese (1780-1825), Napoleon's sister

See also
 Pauline (disambiguation)